A referendum was held in Hungary on 3 April 2022, coinciding with the parliamentary elections. While the overwhelming majority of valid votes were cast as "no" to the four referendum questions, the share of valid votes was below the 50% required for the result to be considered valid.

Background 

The referendum has been called by Fidesz, the ruling party of the Hungarian government, and is described as child protection issues concerning LGBTQ rights after pressure from the European Union (EU) over legislation which the EU says discriminates against LGBTQ people.

The law has been described as appearing to "conflate [and equate] homosexuality and paedophilia, and is modelled partly on a Russian law that banned so-called "gay propaganda" among minors. The Hungarian law goes further, making it an offence to "promote or portray" homosexuality or gender reassignment to minors. It also limits sex education in schools to government-approved organisations".

In a statement released by the Office of the President of the Republic, János Áder said (the statement in full): "Hungary's National Assembly voted unanimously on November 9, 2021 to allow holding a referendum on the day of the general election. "The legal conditions for holding a referendum are in place for four questions on which referendums have been initiated. "Taking into consideration the deadlines set by the laws on electoral and referendum procedures, a referendum on the four issues in question and the general election can only be held simultaneously on April 3 or April 10. "In view of this, I have set the referendum on the four issues specified in Parliamentary Resolution 32/2021 of November 30 for April 3, 2022."

Opposition politicians abstained from voting on the resolution.

Proposed changes 
The four questions were:

Criticism

The parts of the law that are in question in the referendum have been condemned by human rights groups and labelled as "vigorous anti-LGBT rhetoric" and "intended to limit minority rights". Human rights groups have also said the referendum is likely to increase discrimination and stigmatisation of Hungary's LGBT community, and make life more difficult for LGBT children.

The proposals have been widely criticised by the EU due to contravening Article 21 of the EU Charter of Fundamental Rights. This article states "stigmatizing LGBTIQ persons constitute a clear breach of their fundamental right to dignity, as provided for in the EU Charter and international law." EU Commission president, Ursula von der Leyen, has described the bill as discriminatory and "a shame".

Luca Dudits, executive board member of the Háttér Society, the largest and oldest LGBT organisation in Hungary, said this referendum is "another tool of Viktor Orbán's communication campaign." She told Euronews, "If you want to pass a controversial law, you should win a referendum before that".

A joint statement from 10 Hungarian LGBT+ and human rights groups including Budapest Pride and Amnesty International Hungary called for citizens to give invalid answers to the referendum, circling both "yes" and "no" for every question to "help ensure that the government's exclusionary referendum does not reach the validity threshold."

Results

Turnout

Results 
(As of: 2 May 2022, 22:34)

At 100% counted, the Hungarian National Election Office reports:

For question 1:
 Yes: 300,282 (7.68% of valid votes)
 No: 3,610,154 (92.32% of valid votes)
 Valid votes: 3,910,436 (47.60% of registered voters)
 Invalid votes: 1,717,702 (20.91% of registered voters)

For question 2:
 Yes: 158,447 (4.08% of valid votes)
 No: 3,721,934 (95.92% of valid votes)
 Valid votes: 3,880,381 (47.23% of registered voters)
 Invalid votes: 1,747,757 (21.27% of registered voters)

For question 3:
 Yes: 180,785 (4.67% of valid votes)
 No: 3,691,376 (95.33% of valid votes)
 Valid votes: 3,872,161 (47.13% of registered voters)
 Invalid votes: 1,755,977 (21.37% of registered voters)

For question 4:
 Yes: 186,938 (4.83% of valid votes)
 No: 3,683,104 (95.17% of valid votes)
 Valid votes: 3,870,042 (47.11% of registered voters)
 Invalid votes: 1,758,096 (21.40% of registered voters)

None of the questions reached the required threshold of 50% of registered voters casting a valid "yes" or "no" vote (4,107,652) in order for the referendum to be declared valid and binding.

Aftermath 
Following the referendum, the Hungarian National Election Committee fined 16 civil society organisations, including Amnesty International, the Háttér Society, and the Hungarian Civil Liberties Union, for having campaigned against the referendum. Amnesty International stated that the fines were an attempt "to silence us because our campaign and civil collaboration was successful." Later, the organizations challenged the decision at the Curia of Hungary, and the court ruled in their favour.

See also
 Anti-LGBT curriculum laws in the United States
 Censorship of LGBT issues
 Education and the LGBT community
 LGBT rights in the European Union
 LGBT sex education

References

External links
 Hungary to hold referendum on LGBT issues by early 2022. Reuters. Published 22 July 2021.
 Hungary parliament clears way for government's anti-LGBT referendum as election approaches. The Independent. Published 30 November 2021.

2022 in Hungary
2022 in LGBT history
Hungary
Discrimination against LGBT people
Anti-LGBT sentiment
Homophobia
Education in Hungary
LGBT-related legislation
LGBT rights in Hungary
Referendums in Hungary
Sexuality in Hungary
Education controversies
Censorship of LGBT issues
Amnesty International
2022 elections in Hungary